Juan Santamaría International Airport  is the primary airport serving San José, the capital of Costa Rica. The airport is located in the city of Alajuela, 20 km (12 miles) west of downtown San José. It is named after Costa Rica's national hero, Juan Santamaría, a drummer boy who died in 1856 defending his country against forces led by American filibuster William Walker.

The airport is a hub for Avianca Costa Rica, Costa Rica Green Airways, Sansa Airlines, and Volaris Costa Rica and a focus city for Copa Airlines. It was the country's only international gateway for many years, but now there is also an international airport in Liberia, Guanacaste. Both airports have direct flights to North and Central America and Europe, but Juan Santamaría International Airport also serves cities in South America and the Caribbean.

Juan Santamaría International Airport was once the busiest airport in Central America, but is currently second after Tocumen International Airport in Panamá. In 2016, Juan Santamaría International Airport received 4.6 million passengers (international and domestic). In 2011, the airport was named the 3rd Best Airport in Latin America - Caribbean from the Airport Service Quality Awards by Airports Council International.

History
The airport was built to replace the previous one in downtown San Jose where Parque La Sabana is located today. Funding was secured by the government in 1951 and construction proceed slowly until the airport was officially inaugurated on May 2, 1958. It was initially called "Aeropuerto Internacional el Coco" after its location of the same name in the province of Alajuela. It was later renamed in honor of Juan Santamaría. In 1961, funding was secured to build the highway connecting the airport to downtown San José.

Ground transportation
The road access to the airport is on an exit at Route 1, and near the exit to Alajuela. There is a parking area with surcharge, plus a bus stop with plenty of services to San Jose downtown (with no exact schedule but with 24-hours bus service and approximately one service every 10 minutes during working hours). Licensed taxis are available in the airport and will generally accept both colones and U.S. dollars, but not other currencies. Costa Rican taxis are red with yellow triangles on the doors, ubiquitous all over the country, plus there is a special airport taxi service that is licensed and employs orange taxis. While the rail line linking downtown Alajuela with San José's Atlantic Station passes in close proximity to the airport, there is no station serving the airport and no rail service of any kind to the airport.

Facilities

The airport's sole runway allows operations of large widebody aircraft. Currently, some scheduled flights are operated with Airbus A330, A340 and A350, and Boeing 747, 767, 777 and 787, for both passengers and freight. A Concorde landed in 1999 for that year's airshow. Previously, the airport had a small hangar, called the "NASA" hangar, to house research aircraft, like the Martin B-57 Canberra high altitude aircraft, that were being operated in Costa Rica. After that mission was completed, the hangar was removed.

Internationally the largest operator in the airport is Avianca and all their branches, followed by Copa Airlines which uses the Main Terminal (M), domestically the largest airline is Sansa Airlines and their flights depart from the Domestic Terminal (D). The largest US airlines at the airport by number of destinations served all year-long are American Airlines and jetBlue and the largest European airline at the airport is Iberia which is the only European airline that flies daily between Europe and San José from their base Madrid airport using an Airbus A330-200 combined with the Airbus A350-900XWB (specially in European winter season).

No major changes were made to the terminal until November 1997 when the government issued a decree requesting participation of private companies to manage the operations of the airport. After a few years of legal challenges and contract negotiations, Alterra Partners was given a 20-year concession and started managing the facilities in May 2001.  It was also expected that the company would finish the necessary expansion and construction of new facilities, however in March 2002, Alterra announced it would cease any further construction due to disagreements over financing and airport use fee billing with the government. The dispute was extended for a few years and problems started at the terminal; in 2005, the International Civil Aviation Organization pointed out that the airport did not comply with safety regulations. In July 2009, Alterra yielded the contract to a consortium composed of Houston-based Canadian-American company ADC & HAS and the Brazilian company, Andrade Gutierrez Concessoes (AGC) - subsidiary of the conglomerate Andrade Gutierrez. In December 2009, Alterra Partners changed its name to AERIS Holdings, S.A. In November 2010, Aeris announced it had finished the expansion and construction of new facilities with the installation of the 9th boarding bridge.

The airport houses three business lounges for both special card holders and business class travellers; Avianca Club, Copa Club and VIP Lounge (for BAC Credomatic customers).

Airlines and destinations
The following airlines have scheduled direct services to and/or from Juan Santamaría International Airport:

Passenger

Notes

 Volaris Costa Rica flies to Mexico City non-stop but also has flights via Guatemala City. They have fifth freedom rights to transport passengers solely between Guatemala City and Mexico City.

 Volaris Costa Rica flies to New York–JFK via San Salvador. They have fifth freedom rights to transport passengers solely between San Salvador and New York.

Cargo

Statistics
Juan Santamaria International Airport is the largest and busiest airport in Costa Rica, having experienced a constant increase in traffic since its opening in 1958, boosted by the growing flow of tourists. The airport reached more than one million passengers per year for the first time in 1991 and having a record number of passengers in 2019. Traffic movements reached its highest number in 2017, while freight (in metric tons) reached a peak in 2011, with 98,609 tons.

Top international destinations

Accidents and incidents
On May 23, 1988, a leased Boeing 727-100 (TI-LRC) operating the route San Jose-Managua-Miami, collided with a fence at the end of the runway in the Juan Santamaria International Airport, crashed at a nearby field next to a highway, and caught fire. The excess of weight in the front part of the airplane was the cause of the accident. There were no fatalities out of the 23 occupants.
On January 16, 1990, SANSA Flight 32 crashed into the Cerro Cedral, a mountain, shortly after takeoff from Juan Santamaria International Airport. All 20 passengers and 3 crew on board perished in the crash.
On September 3, 2007, a North American Rockwell Sabreliner 70 registration N726JR aborted the takeoff from runway 07. The airplane ran off the right side of the runway into the grass. The landing gear collapsed as the plane skidded and turned 180 degrees. The aircraft was written off.
On April 7, 2022, DHL Aero Expreso Flight 7216, a Boeing 757-27A operated by DHL Aviation en route to Guatemala City skidded off the runway while performing an emergency landing due to a hydraulic problem. The aircraft was written off because the tail section broke off, however there was no fire or injuries reported.

See also
 Transport in Costa Rica
 List of airports in Costa Rica

References

External links

 
 
Dirección General de Aviación Civil de Costa Rica Costa Rican Aviation Authority
Sansa Costa Rica Sansa Costa Rica Airline
OpenStreetMap - Alajuela

Airports in Costa Rica
Greater Metropolitan Area (Costa Rica)
Buildings and structures in Alajuela Province
Institutions of Costa Rica
Airports established in 1958
1958 establishments in Costa Rica